Normanby could be:

Places

Australia 
Normanby, Queensland
Normanby Division, a local government area in Queensland
Shire of Normanby, a local government area in Queensland
Normanby Island (Queensland)
Electoral district of Normanby (disambiguation), Queensland
Normanby River, third largest river in Australia and largest Australian river to the Pacific
County of Normanby, Victoria

Canada 
 Normanby Township, Ontario, a disbanded township in Grey County, Ontario

New Zealand 
Normanby, Otago, a suburb of Dunedin
Normanby, Taranaki, a small town in Taranaki

Papua New Guinea 
Normanby Island, Papua New Guinea

United Kingdom 
Normanby, Redcar and Cleveland, North Yorkshire, home of Normanby Hall
 Normanby, Whitby, North Yorkshire
Normanby, Ryedale, North Yorkshire
Normanby, North Lincolnshire, home of Normanby Hall
Normanby by Spital
Normanby by Stow
Normanby le Wold

Other
Marquess of Normanby